Hello is an album by the rock group Half Japanese, released in 2001 on Alternative Tentacles.

Critical reception
The Austin Chronicle called it "an excellent introduction to Half Japanese." Cleveland Scene deemed it "easily one of Half Japanese's most forceful and linear albums in years." The Chicago Reader wrote that the album "comes close to something recognizable as organized 'rock,' [but] still has that essential loopy charm."

Track listing
"All The Angels Said Go To Her" - 2.47
"Patty" - 2.34
"Temptation" - 2.18
"The Legend Of Hillbilly John" - 1.32
"Mississippi" - 3.48
"No Doubt" - 4.01
"10.00 AM" - 2.09
"Jump Into The Mess" - 3.36
"Red Sun" - 2.07
"Whatever The Outcome" - 4.03
"Best Of The Best" - 2.59
"Summer Nights" - 3.53
"Our Turn" - 4.27
"Starlight" - 1.48
"The Good Side" - 1.51
"Super-Size It" - 4.50
"Happyland" - 4.53

References

External links
Hello at Discogs

2001 albums
Half Japanese albums
Alternative Tentacles albums